The Augusta Wildlife Area is a tract of protected land located in Eau Claire County, Wisconsin, managed by the Wisconsin Department of Natural Resources (WDNR). The Wildlife Area falls within the bounds of both the Western Coulee and Ridges Ecological Landscape and the Central Sand Plains Ecological Landscape.

Flora and Fauna
There are several different types of trees in the Wildlife Area, including white pine, red pine, aspen, jack pine and red maple.

Besides trees, there are many other notable flora to be found within the boundaries of the Wildlife Area, such as reed canary grass, cattails, blue flag iris, sphagnum moss and bur-reed.

The area was founded in part to provide for the production of geese and ducks, and as such there is a sizable population of both in the Wildlife Area. In addition to the various waterfowl that are found in the area,(such as the green-winged teal and American Wigeon) bears, deer, cottontail rabbits, coyotes, otters and sandhill cranes have also been observed in the area.

See also
 Eau Claire Dam
 Geography of Wisconsin

References

External Links
 U.S. Geological Survey Map at the U.S. Geological Survey Map Website. Retrieved March 16, 2022.

State Wildlife Area
Protected areas of Wisconsin
Geography of Eau Claire County, Wisconsin
Protected areas established in 1942